The men's lightweight coxless four competition at the 2016 Summer Olympics in Rio de Janeiro was held on 6–11 August at the Lagoon Rodrigo de Freitas. This was the last time that this boat class competed, as FISA axed it after the 2017 World Rowing Championships with immediate effect.

Results

Heats
First three of each heat qualify to the semifinals, remainder goes to the repechage.

Heat 1

Heat 2

Heat 3

Repechage
First three of heat qualify to the semifinals.

Heat 1

Semifinals

Semifinal 1

Semifinal 2

Final

Final B

Final A
The medals for the competition were presented by Denis Oswald, Switzerland, member of the International Olympic Committee, and the gifts were presented by Matt Smith, United States of America, Executive Director of the International Rowing Federation.

Aftermath
This was the last time the Danish Gold Four competed, as they did not nominate their boat for the 2017 World Rowing Championships.

To achieve gender equality in rowing, FISA suggested early in 2017 to drop the lightweight men's four from the Olympic programme, and the recommendation was adopted by the executive board of the International Olympic Committee in June 2017. Shortly after the 2017 championships, the FISA council voted to remove the lightweight men's four from the world championships with immediate effect.

References

Men's lightweight coxless four
Men's events at the 2016 Summer Olympics